David Romo (born 7 August 1978) is a French former footballer who played in the Football League for Swansea City. Romo scored his only goal for Swansea in a 2–0 win over Mansfield Town in March 2002.

References

1978 births
Living people
French footballers
Association football midfielders
En Avant Guingamp players
Swansea City A.F.C. players
English Football League players